Prinair Flight 277 was a regular passenger flight by Puerto Rican airline Prinair, between Cyril E. King International Airport in Charlotte Amalie, St. Thomas, United States Virgin Islands, and Isla Verde International Airport in Carolina, Puerto Rico, a suburb of San Juan. On 5 March 1969, the flight, operated by de Havilland Heron 2D N563PR, crashed into a mountain near Fajardo, killing all 19 occupants on board.

Flight
Prinair Flight 277 left Charlotte-Amalie at 5:15 pm on Wednesday, March 5, 1969 for a short flight to the San Juan area's main airport in Carolina. It was an uneventful flight until the airplane entered mainland Puerto Rico.

Then, the airport's approach controller responded with, "Prinair two seven seven San Juan Approach Control radar contact three miles east of Isla Verde fly a heading of two five zero for a vector to ILS final maintain four thousand." The approach controller, who was a trainee on the fateful afternoon, mistakenly thought that Prinair Flight 277 was near San Juan, but it was instead near Luquillo at what is described as the "Fajardo intersection". The airplane was vectored for a landing into runway 7. The plane's pilots, trusting that the information given to them was correct, followed the instructions and prepared for landing, soon finding themselves in front of an unavoidable mountain instead. At 5:38 pm, 23 minutes after the flight took off from St. Thomas, it crashed into some trees on the Sierra Luquillo mountains, killing everyone on board.

Investigation
An NTSB investigation that followed discovered that this accident would not have been survivable in any way. The controller's home and belongings were investigated as part of the investigation and it was found he had a typical family life, along with some of the furnishings and electrical objects found at a typical family house.

On March 17, 1969, the controller revealed to investigators, that 3 years before, a flight surgeon had sent him to see both a psychiatrist and a psychologist, and that on March 5, the day of the accident, he was feeling very tense and anxious.

The controller's erroneous indications meant he thought the aircraft was   further west than it actually was. About 5:33 pm, or five minutes before the crash, the flight coordinator's supervisor ordered him to go perform other duties, and then proceeded to give the controller's instructor instructions to go and do collateral duties. By then, the controller was directing 5 flights, including Prinair Flight 277. Some pilots on these five flights were heard complaining because the instructor's own transmissions were interrupting the controller's.

Several other key elements were discovered by the investigation.

See also

Similar air crashes into mountains and related articles

 1986 Aerovías Guatemala air crash
 2012 Mexico Learjet 25 crash
 Air New Zealand Flight 901
 American Airlines Flight 965
 Avianca Flight 011
 Avianca Flight 410
 Aviateca Flight 901
 Controlled flight into terrain
 List of accidents and incidents involving commercial aircraft
 Merpati Nusantara Airlines Flight 9760
 PIA Flight 268
 1995 Air St. Martin Beech 1900 crash
 Alaska Airlines Flight 1866
 1983 TAME 737-200 crash
 Independent Air Flight 1851
 1949 Mexicana DC-3 crash
 Tara Air Flight 193
 Tara Air Flight 197

References

Aviation accidents and incidents in the United States in 1969
1969 in Puerto Rico
Airliner accidents and incidents in Puerto Rico
Prinair accidents and incidents
Prinair
Transportation in San Juan, Puerto Rico
Accidents and incidents involving the de Havilland Heron
March 1969 events in North America
Airliner accidents and incidents involving controlled flight into terrain